Sophia McIntyre is an Australian diplomat who was appointed Ambassador to Spain in June 2020.

McIntyre graduated from the University of Sydney with a Bachelor of Laws and a Bachelor of Arts. She completed a graduate diploma in foreign affairs and trade at Monash University.

References 

Living people
Year of birth missing (living people)
Ambassadors of Australia to Spain
Australian women ambassadors
University of Sydney alumni
Monash University alumni